Stewart Home & School is a residential school in Franklin County, Kentucky serving individuals with intellectual or developmental disabilities. The school was established by Dr. John Q. A. Stewart in 1893 on the former site of Kentucky Military Institute on Lawrenceburg Road, five miles southeast of Frankfort. The school has been in continuous operation by five generations of the Stewart family, and was placed on the United States National Register of Historic Places June 3, 1976.

References

National Register of Historic Places in Franklin County, Kentucky
Educational institutions established in 1893
Italianate architecture in Kentucky
Schools in Franklin County, Kentucky
School buildings on the National Register of Historic Places in Kentucky
Private schools in Kentucky
Historic districts on the National Register of Historic Places in Kentucky
Greek Revival architecture in Kentucky
Special schools in the United States
1893 establishments in Kentucky
School buildings completed in 1840